James Reid (1883 – 13 January 1935) was an Irish racewalker. He competed in the men's 3500 metres walk at the 1908 Summer Olympics, representing Great Britain.

References

1883 births
1935 deaths
Athletes (track and field) at the 1908 Summer Olympics
Irish male racewalkers
British male racewalkers
Olympic athletes of Great Britain
Place of birth missing